Burgerkill is an Indonesian heavy metal band formed in Bandung in 1995, currently consisting of Ronald (vocals), Agung (guitars), Ramdan (bass), and Putra Pra Ramadhan (drums).

Albums

Studio albums

Split album

Repacked album/EPs

DVDs

Music videos

Compilations appearance 
Beside studio album release, Burgerkill also has numerous other works that appeared in several media package, such as singles for various artist compilation album, or original soundtrack movie.

References 

Heavy metal group discographies
Discographies of Indonesian artists